Haldia Government College, established in 1988, is the oldest government college in Purba Medinipur district. It offers undergraduate courses in arts, sciences and one self finance course (Tourism and Travel Management). There are also two postgraduate courses, Chemistry and Geography. It is affiliated to Vidyasagar University.

History
Haldia is a famous river-port town on the banks of the Hooghly River. It is an industrial belt in eastern India. The government of West Bengal established this college in 1988 to fulfil the higher education demands of this area.

Location
The college is located beside the broad four-lane highway between Rani Chak and City Centre bus stop. It is well connected with NH-41 and also the South-Eastern Railways.

Undergraduate departments

Science subjects
 Anthropology
 Chemistry
 Economics
 Geography
 Mathematics
 Physics
 Statistics

Arts subjects
 Bengali
 Education
 English
 Sociology
 Physical Education

Self financing (major) subject
 Tourism and Travel Management

Postgraduate departments
 Chemistry
 Geography

Accreditation
Recently, Haldia Government College has been awarded B+ grade by the National Assessment and Accreditation Council (NAAC). The college is also recognized by the University Grants Commission (UGC).

See also
List of institutions of higher education in West Bengal
Education in India
Education in West Bengal

References

External links

Vidyasagar University
University Grants Commission
National Assessment and Accreditation Council

Universities and colleges in Purba Medinipur district
Colleges affiliated to Vidyasagar University
Haldia
Educational institutions established in 1988
1988 establishments in West Bengal